Robert Heaney (1936–2019), nicknamed "Babe", was an Australian rugby league footballer who played in the 1950s.  He played for Balmain in the NSWRL Competition.

Playing career
Heaney made his first grade debut for Balmain in 1956.  Heaney played in the 1956 NSWRL grand final against St George at the Sydney Cricket Ground.  Balmain lost the match 18–12 and the victory started St George on a run of 11 straight premiership victories.

Heaney played on with Balmain in 1957 before departing the club.  In 1959, Heaney represented NSW Country.

Death
Heaney died on 13 January 2019.

References

1936 births
2019 deaths
Balmain Tigers players
Country New South Wales Origin rugby league team players
Rugby league players from Sydney
Rugby league props
Place of birth missing
Place of death missing